Ini Ellam Sugame is a 1998 Indian Tamil-language romance film directed by A. R. Ramesh. The film stars Abbas, Sanghavi and Shruthi Raj, with R. Sundarrajan, Jai Ganesh and K. R. Vatsala playing supporting roles. It was released on 18 March 1998.

Plot

Aravind (Abbas) comes to Chennai to participate in a singing competition. During the competition, Aravind falls in love at first sight with the female spectator Nandhini (Sanghavi) so does she. He eventually wins the first prize. Aravind and Nandhini want to meet each other and express their feelings.

Aravind decides to stay in Chennai to find Nandhini. Meanwhile, he befriends the clever Chennaite Mani (R. Sundarrajan) and his neighbour Nirmala (Shruthi Raj).

Nandhini is the boss of an advertising company. Later, he is hired as a model in her company but Aravind and Nandhini don't express their love. With Aravind's help, Nirmala is also hired in Nandhini's company. Nirmala eventually falls in love with Aravind. What transpires later forms the crux of the story.

Cast

Abbas as Aravind
Sanghavi as Nandhini
Shruthi Raj as Nirmala
R. Sundarrajan as Mani
Jai Ganesh as Nandhini's father
K. R. Vatsala as Nirmala's mother
Pandu
D. Rajan as Rajan
Balu Anand
Vasuki
Ravishankar
Sudhakar
Idichapuli Selvaraj
Tirupur Ramasamy
Mannangatti Subramaniam
Subramani
Singamuthu
Ramesh Prabhu in a guest appearance
Udhaya in a cameo appearance

Soundtrack

The film score and the soundtrack were composed by Sirpy. The soundtrack, released in 1998, features 5 tracks with lyrics written by Kalidasan, Arivumathi and Palani Bharathi.

References

1998 films
1990s Tamil-language films
Films scored by Sirpy
Films directed by A. R. Ramesh